Vincent-Joseph-Marie de Proisy de Brison (died 28 July 1779, in Brest) was a French Navy officer. He notably served during the War of American Independence.

Biography 
Proisy was born to the family of Jeanne-Marie-Françoise de Héron and of Alphonse de Proisy. His older brother, La Salle Proisy, also served in the Navy. Proisy joined the Navy as a Garde-Marine on 26 November 1745.

Proisy was promoted to Lieutenant on 17 April 1757. On 23 May 1758, he married Pélagie Gouyon. On 19 March 1763, he was made a Knight in the Order of Saint Louis.

In 1765, he commanded the fluyt Forte, carrying wook from Pyrenees. In 1769, he commanded the 12-gun corvette Écureuil between Saint -Domingue and Brest. In 1770, he sailed her to Guadeloupe.

Proisy was promoted to Captain on 24 March 1772. In 1778, Proisy captained the 64-gun Actionnaire, part of the White squadron under Orvilliers. He took part in the Battle of Ushant on 27 July 1778.

Proisy retired from the Navy on 1 July 1779.

Sources and references 
 Notes

Citations

References
 

 
  (1671-1870)
 

External links
 

French Navy officers
French military personnel of the American Revolutionary War